Thomas John Paddison (third ¼ 1883 – death unknown) was a Welsh professional rugby league footballer who played in the 1900s.

Background
Thomas Paddison's birth was registered in Neath district, Wales.

International honours
Thomas Paddison won a cap for Wales while at Merthyr Tydfil in 1908 and represented Welsh League XIII while at Merthyr Tydfil in the 14-13 victory over Australia at Penydarren Park, Merthyr Tydfil on Tuesday 19 January 1909.

References

External links

1883 births
Merthyr Tydfil RLFC players
Place of death missing
Rugby league fullbacks
Rugby league players from Neath Port Talbot
Welsh League rugby league team players
Wales national rugby league team players
Welsh rugby league players
Year of death missing